The New South Wales Bradfield suburban carriage stock were a type of electric multiple unit operated by the New South Wales Government Railways and its successors between 1921 and 1975.

History
With the electrification of the Sydney suburban network planned, in 1919 orders were placed for 100 carriages with contracts awarded to three builders, Clyde Engineering (42), Ritchie Brothers (18) and Meadowbank Manufacturing Company (40).

The carriages featured wooden bodies on steel underframes with 43 fitted out as EBB first class carriages and 57 as EBA second class. The carriages gained the Bradfield carriages nickname after the New South Wales Railway's Chief Engineer John Bradfield, even though they were designed by Chief Mechanical Engineer Edward Lucy.

All were delivered between January 1921 and January 1922 numbered 2112 to 2211. One further first class carriage was delivered as 2212 by the Eveleigh Carriage Workshops in January 1923. All initially entered service as locomotive hauled stock with eight seats fitted in what would later become the driver's cabin.

In preparation for the commissioning of the electrified network, the 101 newly built carriages were converted to driving motor cars at Electric Carriage Workshops being renumbered C3000 to C3100 and operated with American Suburban stock.

In the mid 20s 183 American Suburban end platform carriages were converted into trailer carriages numbered T4101 to T4284 along with a further nine converted into driving trailers numbered D4001 to D4009

The last Bradfield motor car was withdrawn in 1975 with two preserved.

The last trailers and driving trailers were retired in the late 1970s.

Carriages C3001-C3080 were renumbered C7001-C7080 to allow newer Goninan-built S set carriages  to be numbered C3001-C3080.

(Table is for power cars)

Preservation 
Sydney Electric Train Society has Bradfield motor car C3082 preserved. This car were previously owned by RailCorp (now Sydney Trains) but was sold to SETS in 2008 (along with C3104 and C3444). This car is currently in undercover storage at Bilpin.

Sydney Trains / Transport Heritage NSW / Historic Electric Traction has Bradfield motor car C3045 and wooden trailer car T4279 preserved. C3045 is on static display at the NSW Rail Museum, Thirlmere. T4279 is in undercover storage at Redfern, with the rest of the heritage electrics fleet.

Bradfield motor car C3080, Bradfield parcel vans C3661 and C3662, wooden trailer cars T4186 and T4224, and wooden driving trailer car D4004 are all in undercover storage at Rothbury. C3661 is privately owned and the ownership of the other carriages is unknown.

References 

Electric multiple units of New South Wales
1500 V DC multiple units of New South Wales